Gregory John Kragen (born March 4, 1962) is a former American football nose tackle in the National Football League (NFL) including three Super Bowls and five championship games. He was selected for the Pro Bowl in 1989 and made the All-Madden team twice.

Kragen went to high school at Amador Valley High School in Pleasanton, California and then played college football at Utah State University and went undrafted in the NFL draft. After trying out for the Denver Broncos, he was cut. The next year, he again was invited to training camp and this time he made the team. His career lasted thirteen years.  He played nine seasons for the Broncos followed by a year for the Kansas City Chiefs. Then he was selected by the Carolina Panthers in the 1995 NFL Expansion Draft, and played his final three seasons with that team.

1962 births
Living people
American football defensive tackles
Denver Broncos players
Kansas City Chiefs players
Carolina Panthers players
American Conference Pro Bowl players
Utah State Aggies football players
Players of American football from Chicago
People from Pleasanton, California